Biofloc technology (BT) is a fish farming system that recycles waste nutrients as fish food. Biofloc, specifically cultured microorganisms, are introduced into the water to form microbial protein from toxic fish waste and other organic matter in the water. This helps maintain water quality as well as lowering costs. Candidate species must be resistant to environmental changes, be able to tolerate high stocking density, adapt to changes in dissolved oxygen, and be able to take microbial protein as food. BT is currently used in large-scale shrimp and finfish farms, mainly in Asia.

History of BFT 
The first BFT was developed in the 1970s at Ifremer-COP (French Research Institute for Exploitation of the Sea, Oceanic Center of Pacific) with Penaeus monodon, Fenneropenaeus merguiensis, Litopenaeus vannamei, and L. stylirostris... Israel and USA (Waddell Mariculture Center) also started Research and Development with Tilapia and L. vannamei, respectively in the late 1980s and 1990s.

Commercial application started at a farm in Tahiti (French Polynesia) in 1988 using 1000m2 concrete tanks with limited water exchange achieving a record of 20–25 tons/ha/year in 2 crops. A farm located in Belize, Central America also produced around 11-26 tons/ha/cycle using 1.6 ha poly-lined ponds.  Another farm located in Maryland, USA also produced 45 ton shrimp per year using ~570 m3 indoor greenhouse BFT race-ways. BFT have being successfully practiced in large-scale shrimp and finfish farms in Asia, Latin and Central America, the USA, South Korea, Brazil, Italy, China, India, and others. However, research on BFT by Universities and Research Centers are refining BFT, for farm application in grow-out culture, feeding technology, reproduction, microbiology, biotechnology, and economics.

The role of microorganisms 
Microorganisms play a vital role in feeding and maintaining the overall health of cultured animals. The flocs of bacteria (biofloc) are a nutrient rich source of proteins and lipids, which provide a source of food for the fish throughout the day. The water column shows a complex interaction between living microbes, planktons, organic matter, substrates, and grazers, such as rotifers, ciliates, protozoa and copepods which serves as a secondary source of food. The combination of these particulate matters keeps the recycling of nutrients and maintains the water quality 

The consumption of floc by cultured organisms has proven to increase the immunity and growth rate, decrease feed conversion ratio, and reduce the overall cost of production. The growth promotional factors have been attributed to both bacteria and plankton, where up to 30% of the total food is compensated in shrimp

Species compatibility 
There is a norm of species compatibility for culturing in BFT. To achieve a better growth performance, the candidate species must have resistance to high stocking density, adapt to changes in dissolved oxygen (3-6 mg/L), settling solids (10 --15 mL/L)  and total ammonia compounds, omnivorous habits or ability to take microbial protein as food.

References 

Aquaculture